Gordon Bennett Cologne (August 24, 1924 - January 4, 2019) served in the California State Assembly for the 71st from 1961 to 1963 and the 74th district from 1963 to 1965. He also served in the California State Assembly for the 36th district from 1965 to 1967 and the 37th district from 1967 to 1972. Legislation that bears his name includes the Porter-Cologne Water Quality Control Act, anti-pollution legislation which predated the federal Clean Water Act. During World War II, he served in the United States Navy.

References

United States Navy personnel of World War II
1924 births
2019 deaths
Military personnel from California
20th-century American politicians
Republican Party members of the California State Assembly